Dorin Gotonoaga (born 9 September 1995) is a Moldovan judoka. He is the bronze medallist in the -81 kg at the 2021 Judo Grand Prix Zagreb.

References

External links
 

1995 births
Living people
Moldovan male judoka
21st-century Moldovan people